Uranus, the seventh planet of the Solar System, has 27 known moons, most of which are named after characters that appear in, or are mentioned in, the works of William Shakespeare and Alexander Pope. Uranus's moons are divided into three groups: thirteen inner moons, five major moons, and nine irregular moons. The inner and major moons all have prograde orbits, while orbits of the irregulars are mostly retrograde. The inner moons are small dark bodies that share common properties and origins with Uranus's rings. The five major moons are ellipsoidal, indicating that they reached hydrostatic equilibrium at some point in their past (and may still be in equilibrium), and four of them show signs of internally driven processes such as canyon formation and volcanism on their surfaces. The largest of these five, Titania, is 1,578 km in diameter and the eighth-largest moon in the Solar System, about one-twentieth the mass of the Earth's Moon. The orbits of the regular moons are nearly coplanar with Uranus's equator, which is tilted 97.77° to its orbit. Uranus's irregular moons have elliptical and strongly inclined (mostly retrograde) orbits at large distances from the planet.

William Herschel discovered the first two moons, Titania and Oberon, in 1787. The other three ellipsoidal moons were discovered in 1851 by William Lassell (Ariel and Umbriel) and in 1948 by Gerard Kuiper (Miranda). These five may be in hydrostatic equilibrium, and so would be considered dwarf planets if they were in direct orbit about the Sun. The remaining moons were discovered after 1985, either during the Voyager 2 flyby mission or with the aid of advanced Earth-based telescopes.

Discovery 
The first two moons to be discovered were Titania and Oberon, which were spotted by Sir William Herschel on January 11, 1787, six years after he had discovered the planet itself. Later, Herschel thought he had discovered up to six moons (see below) and perhaps even a ring. For nearly 50 years, Herschel's instrument was the only one with which the moons had been seen. In the 1840s, better instruments and a more favorable position of Uranus in the sky led to sporadic indications of satellites additional to Titania and Oberon. Eventually, the next two moons, Ariel and Umbriel, were discovered by William Lassell in 1851. The Roman numbering scheme of Uranus's moons was in a state of flux for a considerable time, and publications hesitated between Herschel's designations (where Titania and Oberon are Uranus II and IV) and William Lassell's (where they are sometimes I and II). With the confirmation of Ariel and Umbriel, Lassell numbered the moons I through IV from Uranus outward, and this finally stuck. In 1852, Herschel's son John Herschel gave the four then-known moons their names.

No other discoveries were made for almost another century. In 1948, Gerard Kuiper at the McDonald Observatory discovered the smallest and the last of the five large, spherical moons, Miranda. Decades later, the flyby of the Voyager 2 space probe in January 1986 led to the discovery of ten further inner moons. Another satellite, Perdita, was discovered in 1999 after studying old Voyager photographs.

Uranus was the last giant planet without any known irregular moons, but since 1997 nine distant irregular moons have been identified using ground-based telescopes. Two more small inner moons, Cupid and Mab, were discovered using the Hubble Space Telescope in 2003. As of 2020, the moon Margaret was the last Uranian moon discovered, and its characteristics were published in October 2003.

Spurious moons 
After Herschel discovered Titania and Oberon on January 11, 1787, he subsequently believed that he had observed four other moons: two on January 18 and February 9, 1790, and two more on February 28 and March 26, 1794. It was thus believed for many decades thereafter that Uranus had a system of six satellites, though the four latter moons were never confirmed by any other astronomer. Lassell's observations of 1851, in which he discovered Ariel and Umbriel, however, failed to support Herschel's observations; Ariel and Umbriel, which Herschel certainly ought to have seen if he had seen any satellites beside Titania and Oberon, did not correspond to any of Herschel's four additional satellites in orbital characteristics. Herschel's four spurious satellites were thought to have sidereal periods of 5.89 days (interior to Titania), 10.96 days (between Titania and Oberon), 38.08 days, and 107.69 days (exterior to Oberon). It was therefore concluded that Herschel's four satellites were spurious, probably arising from the misidentification of faint stars in the vicinity of Uranus as satellites, and the credit for the discovery of Ariel and Umbriel was given to Lassell.

Names 

Although the first two Uranian moons were discovered in 1787, they were not named until 1852, a year after two more moons had been discovered. The responsibility for naming was taken by John Herschel, son of the discoverer of Uranus. Herschel, instead of assigning names from Greek mythology, named the moons after magical spirits in English literature: the fairies Oberon and Titania from William Shakespeare's A Midsummer Night's Dream, and the sylph Ariel and gnome Umbriel from Alexander Pope's The Rape of the Lock (Ariel is also a sprite in Shakespeare's The Tempest). The reasoning was presumably that Uranus, as god of the sky and air, would be attended by spirits of the air.

Subsequent names, rather than continuing the airy spirits theme (only Puck and Mab continued the trend), have focused on Herschel's source material. In 1949, the fifth moon, Miranda, was named by its discoverer Gerard Kuiper after a thoroughly mortal character in Shakespeare's The Tempest. The current IAU practice is to name moons after characters from Shakespeare's plays and The Rape of the Lock (although at present only Ariel, Umbriel, and Belinda have names drawn from the latter; all the rest are from Shakespeare). The outer retrograde moons are all named after characters from one play, The Tempest; the sole known outer prograde moon, Margaret, is named from Much Ado About Nothing.

Some asteroids, also named after the same Shakespearean characters, share names with moons of Uranus: 171 Ophelia, 218 Bianca, 593 Titania, 666 Desdemona, 763 Cupido, and 2758 Cordelia.

Characteristics and groups 

The Uranian satellite system is the least massive among those of the giant planets. Indeed, the combined mass of the five major satellites is less than half that of Triton (the seventh-largest moon in the Solar System) alone. The largest of the satellites, Titania, has a radius of 788.9 km, or less than half that of the Moon, but slightly more than that of Rhea, the second-largest moon of Saturn, making Titania the eighth-largest moon in the Solar System. Uranus is about 10,000 times more massive than its moons.

Inner moons 

As of 2020, Uranus is known to have 13 inner moons. Their orbits lie inside that of Miranda. All of the inner moons are intimately connected with the rings of Uranus, which probably resulted from the fragmentation of one or several small inner moons. The two innermost moons (Cordelia and Ophelia) are shepherds of Uranus's ε ring, whereas the small moon Mab is a source of Uranus's outermost μ ring. There may be two additional small (2–7 km in radius) undiscovered shepherd moons located about 100 km exterior to Uranus's α and β rings.

At 162 km, Puck is the largest of the inner moons of Uranus and the only one imaged by Voyager 2 in any detail. Puck and Mab are the two outermost inner satellites of Uranus. All inner moons are dark objects; their geometrical albedo is less than 10%. They are composed of water ice contaminated with a dark material, probably radiation-processed organics.

The small inner moons constantly perturb each other. The system is chaotic and apparently unstable. Simulations show that the moons may perturb each other into crossing orbits, which may eventually result in collisions between the moons. Desdemona may collide with Cressida within the next million years, and Cupid will likely collide with Belinda in the next 10 million years; Perdita and Juliet may be involved in later collisions. Because of this, the rings and inner moons may be under constant flux, with moons colliding and re-accreting on short timescales.

Large moons 
Uranus has five major moons: Miranda, Ariel, Umbriel, Titania, and Oberon. They range in diameter from 472 km for Miranda to 1578 km for Titania. All these moons are relatively dark objects: their geometrical albedo varies between 30 and 50%, whereas their Bond albedo is between 10 and 23%. Umbriel is the darkest moon and Ariel the brightest. The masses of the moons range from 6.7 kg (Miranda) to 3.5 kg (Titania). For comparison, the Moon has a mass of 7.5 kg. The major moons of Uranus are thought to have formed in the accretion disc, which existed around Uranus for some time after its formation or resulted from a large impact suffered by Uranus early in its history. This view is supported by their large thermal inertia, a surface property they share with dwarf planets like Pluto and Haumea. It differs strongly from the thermal behaviour of the Uranian irregular moons that is comparable to classical trans-Neptunian objects. This suggests a separate origin.

All major moons comprise approximately equal amounts rock and ice, except Miranda, which is made primarily of ice. The ice component may include ammonia and carbon dioxide. Their surfaces are heavily cratered, though all of them (except Umbriel) show signs of endogenic resurfacing in the form of lineaments (canyons) and, in the case of Miranda, ovoid race-track like structures called coronae. Extensional processes associated with upwelling diapirs are likely responsible for the origin of the coronae. Ariel appears to have the youngest surface with the fewest impact craters, while Umbriel's appears oldest. A past 3:1 orbital resonance between Miranda and Umbriel and a past 4:1 resonance between Ariel and Titania are thought to be responsible for the heating that caused substantial endogenic activity on Miranda and Ariel.
One piece of evidence for such a past resonance is Miranda's unusually high orbital inclination (4.34°) for a body so close to the planet. The largest Uranian moons may be internally differentiated, with rocky cores at their centers surrounded by ice mantles. Titania and Oberon may harbor liquid water oceans at the core/mantle boundary. The major moons of Uranus are airless bodies. For instance, Titania was shown to possess no atmosphere at a pressure larger than 10–20 nanobar.

The path of the Sun in the local sky over the course of a local day during Uranus's and its major moons' summer solstice is quite different from that seen on most other Solar System worlds. The major moons have almost exactly the same rotational axial tilt as Uranus (their axes are parallel to that of Uranus). The Sun would appear to follow a circular path around Uranus's celestial pole in the sky, at the closest about 7 degrees from it, during the hemispheric summer.  Near the equator, it would be seen nearly due north or due south (depending on the season). At latitudes higher than 7°, the Sun would trace a circular path about 15 degrees in diameter in the sky, and never set during the hermispheric summer, moving to a position over the celestial equator during the Uranian equinox, and then invisible below the horizon during the hemispheric winter.

Irregular moons 

As of 2005 Uranus is known to have nine irregular moons, which orbit it at a distance much greater than that of Oberon, the furthest of the large moons. All the irregular moons are probably captured objects that were trapped by Uranus soon after its formation. The diagram illustrates the orbits of those irregular moons discovered so far. The moons above the X axis are prograde, those beneath are retrograde. The radius of the Uranian Hill sphere is approximately 73 million km.

Uranus's irregular moons range in size from 120–200 km (Sycorax) to about 20 km (Trinculo). Unlike Jupiter's irregulars, Uranus's show no correlation of axis with inclination. Instead, the retrograde moons can be divided into two groups based on axis/orbital eccentricity. The inner group includes those satellites closer to Uranus (a < 0.15 rH) and moderately eccentric (~0.2), namely Francisco, Caliban, Stephano, and Trinculo. The outer group (a > 0.15 rH) includes satellites with high eccentricity (~0.5): Sycorax, Prospero, Setebos, and Ferdinand.

The intermediate inclinations 60° < i < 140° are devoid of known moons due to the Kozai instability. In this instability region, solar perturbations at apoapse cause the moons to acquire large eccentricities that lead to collisions with inner satellites or ejection. The lifetime of moons in the instability region is from 10 million to a billion years.

Margaret is the only known irregular prograde moon of Uranus, and it currently has the most eccentric orbit of any moon in the Solar System, though Neptune's moon Nereid has a higher mean eccentricity. As of 2008, Margaret's eccentricity is 0.7979.

List 

The Uranian moons are listed here by orbital period, from shortest to longest. Moons massive enough for their surfaces to have collapsed into a spheroid are highlighted in light blue and bolded. The inner and major moons all have prograde orbits. Irregular moons with retrograde orbits are shown in dark grey. Margaret, the only known irregular moon of Uranus with a prograde orbit, is shown in light grey. The orbits and mean distances of the irregular moons are variable over short timescales due to frequent planetary and solar perturbations, therefore the listed orbital elements of all irregular moons are averaged over a 8,000-year numerical integration by Brozović and Jacobson (2009). Their orbital elements are all based on the epoch of 1 January 2000 Terrestrial Time.

Sources: NASA/NSSDC, Sheppard, et al. 2005. For the recently discovered outer irregular moons (Francisco through Ferdinand) the most accurate orbital data can be generated with the Minor Planet Center's Natural Satellites Ephemeris Service. The irregulars are significantly perturbed by the Sun.

See also 
List of natural satellites

Notes

References

External links 

 Scott S. Sheppard: Uranus Moons
 Simulation Showing the location of Uranus's Moons
 
 
 Gazetteer of Planetary Nomenclature—Uranus (USGS)

 
Lists of moons